Oshiyan Rural District is a rural district (dehestan) in Chaboksar District, Rudsar County, Gilan Province, Iran. At the 2006 census, its population was 11,269, in 3,216 families. The rural district has 33 villages.

References 

Rural Districts of Gilan Province
Rudsar County